Sinometrius turnai is a species of beetle in the family Carabidae.

References

Paussinae